Michael Richard Ayers,  (born 1935) is a British philosopher and professor emeritus of philosophy at the University of Oxford. He studied at St. John's College of the University of Cambridge, and was a member of Wadham College, Oxford from 1965 until 2002. Among his students are Colin McGinn and William Child.

Career
Ayers's research focuses are in the history of philosophy and in epistemology, metaphysics, and language. He is co-editor of the Cambridge History of Seventeenth-Century Philosophy and subject editor of the Routledge Encyclopedia of Philosophy, has edited the work of George Berkeley and published on Descartes. His most influential contributions, however, concern the work of John Locke. He is the author of Locke: Epistemology and Ontology as well as of several seminal articles on Locke's philosophy.

In 1987 Bryan Magee invited Michael Ayers to talk about Locke and Berkeley in the BBC's series The Great Philosophers.

More recently, Michael Ayers has published further work on metaphysics.

Publications 
 Philosophy and its past, Jonathan Rée, Michael Ayers, Adam Westoby: Harvester Press, 1978.
 Philosophical works : including the works on vision George Berkeley 1685–1753. Michael Ayers (ed.) New ed., revised and enlarged. London : Dent, 1985.
 Locke London : Routledge 1991
 'The foundations of knowledge and the logic of substance: the structure of Locke's general philosophy' in Locke Vere Chappell (ed.), Oxford University Press 1998
 The Cambridge history of seventeenth-century philosophy Daniel Garber, Michael Ayers: Cambridge University Press 1998 
 'What is Realism?' in Supplement to the Proceedings of the Aristotelian Society, Volume 75, Number 1, July 2001
 'The Second Meditation and Objections to Cartesian Dualism' in Christia Mercer and Eileen O'Neill (eds.), Early Modern Philosophy: Mind, Matter, and Metaphysics, Oxford University Press, 2005
 'Ordinary Objects, Ordinary Language and Identity' in The Monist, Vol. 88, No. 4, October 2005
Ayers, Michael R. "Substance, Reality, and the Great Dead Philosophers." American Philosophical Quarterly 7 (1970): 38–49.  The paper is a reply to: 
 Ayers, Michael (2005). "Was Berkeley an empiricist or a rationalist?". The Cambridge Companion to Berkeley. pp. 34–62.
Knowing and Seeing: Groundwork for a New Empiricism, Oxford University Press, Oxford 2019.

Awards 
 FBA: Fellow of the British Academy
 Member of Academia Europaea

External links
Fellows of Wadham College
Routledge Encyclopedia of Philosophy - Editorial Board

References 

1935 births
20th-century British male writers
20th-century British writers
20th-century British philosophers
20th-century essayists
20th-century English historians
21st-century British male writers
21st-century British philosophers
21st-century essayists
21st-century English historians
Analytic philosophers
Aristotelian philosophers
British logicians
British male essayists
Descartes scholars
Empiricists
Epistemologists
Fellows of the British Academy
Fellows of Wadham College, Oxford
George Berkeley scholars
Historians of philosophy
Living people
Locke scholars
Metaphysicians
Metaphysics writers
Ontologists
Ordinary language philosophy
People educated at Battersea Grammar School
Philosophers of education
Philosophers of history
Philosophers of language
Philosophers of logic
Philosophers of mind
Philosophy academics